Larinia is a genus of  orb-weaver spiders first described by Eugène Simon in 1874.

Species
 it contains fifty-eight species:

L. acuticauda Simon, 1906 – West Africa to Israel
L. ambo Harrod, Levi & Leibensperger, 1991 – Ecuador, Peru
L. assimilis Tullgren, 1910 – East Africa
L. astrigera Yin, Wang, Xie & Peng, 1990 – China
L. bharatae Bhandari & Gajbe, 2001 – India
L. bifida Tullgren, 1910 – Central, East, Southern Africa, Seychelles
L. bivittata Keyserling, 1885 – Brazil, Paraguay, Uruguay, Argentina, Chile
L. blandula (Grasshoff, 1971) – West Africa
L. bonneti Spassky, 1939 – France, Central Europe, Hungary, Caucasus, Russia (Europe to Far East), Japan
L. borealis Banks, 1894 – North America
L. bossae Marusik, 1987 – Russia (South Siberia to Far East)
L. chloris (Audouin, 1826) – North and East Africa to Israel, Turkey, Iran, India, Sri Lanka, Bangladesh
L. cyclera Yin, Wang, Xie & Peng, 1990 – China
L. dasia (Roberts, 1983) – Seychelles (Aldabra)
L. delicata Rainbow, 1920 – Australia (Lord Howe Is.)
L. dinanea Yin, Wang, Xie & Peng, 1990 – China
L. directa (Hentz, 1847) – USA to Brazil
L. dubia Ott & Rodrigues, 2017 – Brazil
L. duchengcaii Barrion, Barrion-Dupo & Heong, 2013 – China
L. elegans Spassky, 1939 – Austria to China
L. emertoni Gajbe & Gajbe, 2004 – India
L. famulatoria (Keyserling, 1883) – USA, Mexico
L. fangxiangensis Zhu, Lian & Chen, 2006 – China
L. jamberoo Framenau & Scharff, 2008 – Australia (New South Wales, Victoria, South Australia)
L. jaysankari Biswas, 1984 – India
L. jeskovi Marusik, 1987 – Eastern Central Europe to Japan
L. kampala (Grasshoff, 1971) – Uganda
L. kanpurae Patel & Nigam, 1994 – India
L. lampa Harrod, Levi & Leibensperger, 1991 – Peru, Bolivia
L. lineata (Lucas, 1846) – Western Mediterranean
L. liuae Yin & Bao, 2012 – China
L. macrohooda Yin, Wang, Xie & Peng, 1990 – China
L. madhuchhandae Biswas & Raychaudhuri, 2012 – Bangladesh
L. mandlaensis Gajbe, 2005 – India
L. microhooda Yin, Wang, Xie & Peng, 1990 – China
L. minor (Bryant, 1945) – Hispaniola
L. montagui Hogg, 1914 – Australia (mainland, Lord Howe Is., Norfolk Is.)
L. montecarlo (Levi, 1988) – Brazil, Argentina
L. natalensis (Grasshoff, 1971) – South Africa
L. neblina Harrod, Levi & Leibensperger, 1991 – Venezuela
L. nolabelia Yin, Wang, Xie & Peng, 1990 – China
L. obtusa (Grasshoff, 1971) – Congo
L. onoi Tanikawa, 1989 – Japan
L. parangmata Barrion & Litsinger, 1995 – Philippines
L. phthisica (L. Koch, 1871) – India to Bangladesh and Vietnam, Usbekistan, Turkmenistan, China, Japan, Philippines, Papua New Guinea, Australia. Introduced to Greece (Crete)
L. pubiventris Simon, 1889 – Central Asia
L. robusta Ott & Rodrigues, 2017 – Brazil
L. sekiguchii Tanikawa, 1989 – Russia (Far East), China, Japan
L. strandi Caporiacco, 1941 – Ethiopia
L. t-notata (Tullgren, 1905) – Brazil, Argentina
L. tabida (L. Koch, 1872) – Indonesia (Sulawesi) to Australia, New Caledonia
L. tamatave (Grasshoff, 1971) – Madagascar
L. teiraensis Biswas & Biswas, 2007 – India
L. trifida Tullgren, 1910 – Central, East Africa
L. triprovina Yin, Wang, Xie & Peng, 1990 – China
L. tucuman Harrod, Levi & Leibensperger, 1991 – Brazil, Argentina
L. tyloridia Patel, 1975 – India
L. wenshanensis Yin & Yan, 1994 – China

References

External links 

Araneidae
Araneomorphae genera
Cosmopolitan spiders
Taxa named by Eugène Simon